Hubneria affinis is a species of bristle fly in the family Tachinidae. It parasitizes moths such as Arctia caja by laying eggs in the larvae that eventually kill the host.

Distribution
China, British Isles, Belarus, Czech Republic, Estonia, Hungary, Latvia, Lithuania, Poland, Romania, Slovakia, Ukraine, Denmark, Finland, Norway, Sweden, Bulgaria, Greece, 
Italy, Macedonia, Portugal, Serbia, Slovenia, Spain, “Yugoslavia”, Austria, Belgium, France, Germany, Netherlands, Switzerland, Mongolia, Russia, Transcaucasia.

References

Exoristinae
Insects described in 1810
Diptera of Europe
Diptera of Asia
Taxa named by Carl Fredrik Fallén